Deborah Lyons is a Canadian diplomat. She served as Special Representative of the Secretary-General of the United Nations for Afghanistan and Head of the United Nations Assistance Mission in Afghanistan (UNAMA) during 2020 to 2022. Prior to her United Nations posting, she was Canada's ambassador to Israel (2016–2020) and to the Islamic Republic of Afghanistan (2013–2016).

Early life and education 
Lyons grew up in the Chatham neighborhood of Miramichi, New Brunswick, Canada as one of nine siblings. She earned a Bachelor of Arts degree from the University of New Brunswick in 1971, graduating as the first female valedictorian in the university's history, and earned certification from the International Studies Program at the Canadian National Defence College in 1993.

Lyons owned and managed a hunting and fishing lodge on the Miramichi River and an energy and environment consulting firm prior to becoming involved in government.

Career
Lyons was appointed Canada's ambassador to Afghanistan by Prime Minister Stephen Harper on 10 July 2013. She was the only female ambassador in Kabul during her first two years in role, until being joined by ambassador of the United Kingdom to Afghanistan, Dame Karen Pierce, in 2015. During Lyons' tenure, the Canadian Embassy in Kabul moved to the forefront of women's issues in Afghanistan. In regards to her role as the highest ranking female diplomat in Kabul and the impact of her position, Lyons said in 2015, "One thing I know it has done is it has helped the Afghan women’s groups — it has helped validate them, and it has helped them believe that they have got a strong champion for their issues and for their work."

On 19 July 2016, she was appointed ambassador to Israel by Stéphane Dion, Foreign Affairs Minister of the Trudeau Cabinet. She replaced Vivian Bercovici, a controversial appointee who, while serving as envoy to Israel, had made demeaning statements about Palestinians, expressed agreement with and approval of Benjamin Netanyahu's views and his Likud government, and gained a reputation among staff of Global Affairs Canada as "unschooled in diplomacy." Lyons' appointment was welcomed by the Canadian diplomatic corps and Ferry de Kerckhove, a former Canadian envoy to Indonesia and Egypt, noted that the selection of an experienced and intelligent diplomat "underscores the importance that Canada attaches to Israel."

She helped unveil a monument for guards at her embassy who were killed during the Kabul attack on Canadian Embassy guards.

Awards and achievements
 Honorary Doctor of Letters, University of New Brunswick, 2015
 Order of New Brunswick, 2016

References

Year of birth missing (living people)
Living people
Ambassadors of Canada to Afghanistan
Ambassadors of Canada to Israel
Canadian women ambassadors
Members of the Order of New Brunswick
People from Miramichi, New Brunswick
Special Representatives of the Secretary-General of the United Nations
University of New Brunswick alumni